Siahu may refer to:
 Siahu, Fars
 Siahu, Yazd